Charles Lloyd Tuckey (14 February 1854 – 12 August 1925) was an English physician who is widely credited with reintroducing medical hypnotism or hypnotherapy to the United Kingdom in the late nineteenth-century. He was born in Canterbury and educated at King's School, Canterbury before attending medical school at King's College London and Aberdeen University. He went on to practice medicine in London. In 1888, after visiting Ambroise-Auguste Liébeault in France and Drs Frederik van Eeden and Albert van Renterghem in Amsterdam he took up medical hypnotism and attempted to promote it widely despite its fringe status.
He wrote seven editions of the highly influential textbook, Psycho-Therapeutics: Treatment by Hypnotism and Suggestion. He was a member of the Society for Psychical Research from 1889 to 1922, investigated hypnotic phenomena as chair of the organisation's Hypnotism committee and sat on the council from 1897 till his retirement.

References 

1854 births
1925 deaths
Alumni of the University of Aberdeen
Hypnotherapists
19th-century English medical doctors
20th-century English medical doctors
Alumni of King's College London